Samuel Gurrión Matías (born 3 January 1968) is a Mexican politician and lawyer affiliated with the PRI. He currently serves as Deputy of the LXII Legislature of the Mexican Congress representing Oaxaca.

References

1968 births
Living people
Politicians from Oaxaca
20th-century Mexican lawyers
Institutional Revolutionary Party politicians
21st-century Mexican politicians
People from Juchitán de Zaragoza
Deputies of the LXII Legislature of Mexico
Members of the Chamber of Deputies (Mexico) for Oaxaca
21st-century Mexican lawyers